Mayhem most commonly refers to:

 Mayhem (crime), a type of crime

Mayhem may also refer to:

People 
 Monica Mayhem (born 1978), Australian pornographic actress
 Jason "Mayhem" Miller, American mixed martial arts fighter
 Mayhem Miller (drag queen), American drag queen

Art, entertainment, and media

Fiction

 Mayhem (advertising character), portrayed in an Allstate Insurance campaign by Dean Winters
 Mayhem (comics), a Marvel Comics character
 Mayhem! (comics), an Image Comics miniseries

Games 
 Mayhem (video game), a 2011 3D demolition derby video game
 Ani-Mayhem, an anime-based collectible card game
 WCW Mayhem (video game), a 1999 game based on the event
 Worms 4: Mayhem, a 2005 3D artillery video game

Music 
 Mayhem Festival, an American hard rock/metal festival
 Mayhem (band), a Norwegian black metal band
 Mayhem (rapper), an English grime MC
 Mayhem (Toyah album)
 Mayhem (Imelda May album)
 "Mayhem" (Imelda May song), the title track
 "Mayhem" (Halestorm song), 2015
 "Mayhem" (Steve Aoki and Quintino song), 2018

Film and television
 TV Mayhem, a 1991 television show
 "Mayhem" (Criminal Minds), an episode of Criminal Minds
 "Mayhem" (Law & Order), an episode of Law & Order
 Mayhem (film), an American action-horror film directed by Joe Lynch

Sports

 Michigan Mayhem, an American minor league basketball team
 Minneapolis Mayhem, an American rugby union team
 Tampa Mayhem, an American rugby league team
 West Michigan Mayhem, a women's professional American football team
 Florida Mayhem, an American esports team in the Overwatch League

Professional wrestling
 WCW Mayhem, a World Championship Wrestling event
Mayhem (1999)
Mayhem (2000)

See also 
 "Mayham", a 2006 episode of the TV series The Sopranos